Story County is a county in the U.S. state of Iowa. As of the 2020 census, the population was 98,537, making it the ninth-most populous county in Iowa. The county seat is Nevada; the largest city is Ames.

Story County comprises the Ames, IA Metropolitan Statistical Area, which is included in the Des Moines-Ames-West Des Moines, IA Combined Statistical Area.

The county is home to Iowa State University in Ames.

History

The land that today is known as Story County was originally prairie with the exception of some groves along the larger streams in the area. In 1846 the boundaries of Story County were established.

The county was named after Joseph Story, a preeminent United States Supreme Court Justice, in 1853. The first settlers to the area came from Indiana, then from the New England states of New York and Pennsylvania. Later, many Norwegians, Germans and Danes came directly from overseas and inhabited the area. The first large population influx occurred during the 1850s. Story County was not mentioned in the Federal Census in 1850, but figures from the State of Iowa put the population at 214 in 1852. By 1860 the population had increased to 4,501.

Three commissioners were appointed by the Iowa legislature to determine the county seat location. On June 27, 1853, they announced Nevada as their choice. Nevada (pronounced Nuh-VAY-Dah) was named after the Sierra Nevada mountain range in California. Like many Midwestern towns, cities and counties, many prominent locations from the newly explored West and Mexican–American War of the late 1840s inspired the naming of towns and counties in Iowa during this period.

Railroad construction did more to develop Story County than any other single factor. The first railroad came to the county in 1864. Railroads were such a decisive factor in determining the location of towns that several communities in Story County moved to be closer to the rail line. Some flourishing little towns that were bypassed by the railroad soon disappeared. Although Nevada was long the population center of the county, Ames was the most widely known of the towns because of the busy railroad depot where travelers would transfer to their next train.

Story County has had five courthouses. The first, a two-level frame building, was erected in 1856. Fire destroyed it in 1863, and it was replaced by a similar structure, which was replaced by a larger three-level building in 1877, situated on the town square. This building's tower served as a vantage point to view the countryside; it was eventually removed for safety reasons. The fourth courthouse was built in 1967 and placed in service on May 18, 1968. That building is still in use as offices for the Board of Supervisors, Auditor, Treasurer, Recorder, Assessor, Information Technology, Facilities Management, Health and Planning & Development Offices. A cannon from the Civil War rests on the lawn. The current courthouse, the Story County Justice Center, opened in 2002. The Justice Center, comprising the law enforcement and judicial aspects of Story County Government. The Justice Center houses the Sheriff's Office & Jail, Attorney, and Clerk of Court.

Story County consists of 16 townships and 15 incorporated cities, and 4 unincorporated towns. The population of 79,981 in the 2000 census consisted of 71,114 in urban areas and 8867 in rural areas.

Geography

Adjacent counties
 Hamilton County (northwest)
 Hardin County (northeast)
 Marshall County (east)
 Jasper County (southeast)
 Polk County (south)
 Boone County (west)

Transportation

Transit
 CyRide
 List of intercity bus stops in Iowa

Major highways

Airports
Story County is home to the Ames Municipal Airport, on the south side of Ames. The nearest large airport is the Des Moines International Airport, on the south side of Des Moines, some 30 miles from Story County.

Rail lines
Story County contains three rail lines, all controlled by the Union Pacific Railroad Company. The Overland Route runs east–west on its route from Chicago to California, passing near Ames, Colo and Nevada in Story County. The Spine Line runs north–south on its route from Minneapolis to Kansas City, Missouri, passing near McCallsburg, Nevada and Cambridge. The third line in Story County begins at Ames and runs near Gilbert and Story City.

Demographics

2020 census
There were 41,361 housing units, of which 38,273 were occupied.

2010 census
The following Story County statistics were gathered by the 2010 U.S. Census.

Population
Story County had a population of 89,542, a 12% increase from the 2000 Census. Of that number, 17.8% of those people are under the age of 18, and 10% are over the age of 65, 95.1% of those people (age 25+) are high school graduates, and 45.4% (age 25+) hold at least a bachelor's degree.

Commuting time
Story County workers age 16 and older spent an average of 16.6 minutes traveling to work between 2005 and 2009.

Workforce data
There were 45,010 individuals working in Story County and 81.5% of those people live in Story County. The remaining percentages break down as follows:
6.8% live in Boone County (directly west)
4.2% live in Polk County (directly south)
2.1% live in Hamilton County (directly north)
1.2% live in Hardin County (directly north)
1.1% live in Marshal County (directly east).

There were 43,839 working individuals who lived in Story County and worked anywhere, and 83.7% of those people worked in Story County.

Household data
According to the 2010 U.S. Census, the median household income in 2009 was $48,165, with an average of 2.41 people per household between 2005 and 2009.

The per capita income in the past 12 months (2009 dollars) between 2005 and 2009 was $24,202.

2000 census

As of the census of 2000, there were 79,981 people, 29,383 households, and 17,042 families in the county. The population density was 140 people per square mile (54/km2). There were 30,630 housing units at an average density of 54 per square mile (21/km2). The racial makeup of the county was 91.14% White, 1.83% Black or African American, 0.16% Native American, 5.10% Asian, 0.03% Pacific Islander, 0.60% from other races, and 1.14% from two or more races. 1.55% of the population were Hispanic or Latino of any race.

Of the 29,383 households 27.30% had children under the age of 18 living with them, 49.60% were married couples living together, 5.90% had a female householder with no husband present, and 42.00% were non-families. 26.70% of households were one person and 7.60% were one person aged 65 or older. The average household size was 2.39 and the average family size was 2.94.

Age spread: 19.10% under the age of 18, 28.30% from 18 to 24, 25.50% from 25 to 44, 17.30% from 45 to 64, and 9.80% 65 or older. The median age was 26 years. For every 100 females there were 104.60 males. For every 100 females age 18 and over, there were 104.40 males.

The median household income was $40,442 and the median family income  was $55,472. Males had a median income of $36,756 versus $26,941 for females. The per capita income for the county was $19,949. About 5.50% of families and 14.10% of the population were below the poverty line, including 6.80% of those under age 18 and 4.30% of those age 65 or over.

Story County laborshed
Total potential labor force

According to the Story County Laborshed Analysis, which was analyzed and compiled by the Iowa Workforce Development in August 2011, Story County has a total potential labor force of 424,702 people, which breaks down as follows:
 Employed – 75.3%
 Unemployed – 8.37%
 Homemakers – 7.8%
 Retired – 8.2%

Likelihood to accept / change employment
The estimated number of individuals who are very likely or somewhat likely to change or accept employment is 106,383, or 25%.
 Employed – 87.6%
 Unemployed – 3%
 Homemakers – 5.2%
 Retired – 4.2%

Unemployment
Of those unemployed and willing to enter / re-enter employment:
 Average age – 45
 Male – 50%
 Female – 50%
 Have Education Beyond High School – 67.5%

Wages
The estimated wage range to attract the upper 66-75% of qualified hourly wage applicants is $10 to $10.44 per hour, with a median of the lowest wage at $10 per hour.

Commute
Those unemployed and willing to enter / re-enter employment are willing to commute an average of 24 miles one way for the right opportunity.

Law enforcement

Primary law enforcement for the county rests with the Story County Sheriff's Office. The department provides law enforcement services for the contract towns and unincorporated areas of Story County, as well as providing for courthouse security, operating the county jail, and performing civil procedures. Paul H. Fitzgerald has served as Sheriff since 1993.

Other law enforcement agencies in the county include:
 Ames Police Department
 Iowa State University Police Division
 Nevada Police Department
 Huxley Police Department
 Story City Police Department

Communities

Cities

 Ames
 Cambridge
 Collins
 Colo
 Gilbert
 Huxley
 Kelley
 Maxwell
 McCallsburg
 Nevada
 Roland
 Sheldahl
 Slater
 Story City
 Zearing

Unincorporated communities
 Fernald
 Iowa Center
 Shipley

Townships

 Collins
 Franklin
 Grant
 Howard
 Indian Creek
 Lafayette
 Lincoln
 Milford
 Nevada
 New Albany
 Palestine
 Richland
 Sherman
 Union
 Warren
 Washington

Population ranking
The population ranking of the following table is based on the 2020 census of Story County.

† county seat

Politics
Prior to 1988, Story County was primarily Republican in presidential elections, only failing to back the Republican Party candidate three times between 1896 and 1984. Since 1988 Story County has voted reliably Democratic, mirroring the trend in counties dominated by college towns. Donald Trump's 2016 election performance in the county was over 3 points worse than Mitt Romney in 2012, despite Trump outperforming Romney statewide by nearly 5 percent and winning Iowa's electoral votes.

Education
School districts in the county include:
 Ames Community School District
 Ballard Community School District
 Collins-Maxwell Community School District
 Colo-Nesco Community School District
 Gilbert Community School District
 Nevada Community School District
 North Polk Community School District
 Roland-Story Community School District
 United Community School District
 West Marshall Community School District

See also

 National Register of Historic Places listings in Story County, Iowa

References

External links

 Story County government's website
 Ames Historical Society Includes reference materials, early maps and many historical images
 ISU Extension - Story County
 Story County Foundation

 
1846 establishments in Iowa Territory
Populated places established in 1846